A two-barred cross is similar to a Latin cross but with an extra bar added. The lengths and placement of the bars (or "arms") vary, and most of the variations are interchangeably called the cross of Lorraine, the patriarchal cross, the Orthodox cross or the archiepiscopal cross.

The two bars
The two bars can be placed tight together (condensed) or far apart. They can be symmetrically spaced either around the middle, or above or below the middle. One asymmetrical variation has one bar near the top and the other just below the middle.
Finally the bars can be of equal length, or with one shorter than the other.

Decorations
The ends of the arms can be decorated according to different styles. A style with round or rounded ends is called treflée or botonée (from French bouton) in heraldic use. The same style is called budded, apostles' or cathedral cross in religious use. A straight and pointy style called pattée also includes maltese cross variations, and finally a pointed style called aiguisé.

Heraldic use

The crosses appear in heraldic use in the second century A.D. A balanced cross is used in the Coat of arms of Hungary as well as in several small shields within shields of Vytis. An outlined balanced cross (equal length outlined bars on equal distances) is used on coat of arms shields and order medals 

In Slovakia, the flag, the coat of arms and several municipal symbols include a double cross, where graded bars are more common than equally long bars, and balanced distances along the vertical line are more common.

The two-barred cross was also, since around the year 1140, used in Kopnik, Branibor (currently Berlin, Brandenburg) as seen on one of the five emissions of the silver bracteate of Iakša (Jaxa), a Christian state, fief of Poland (archbishops of Gniezno), coined until its invasion and destruction by Germanic "Wendish Crusade" of 1147.

In print
In typography the double cross (U+2021 ‡) is called double dagger, double obelisk and diesis.

In medicine and botany
The International Union Against Tuberculosis and Lung Disease has used a red two-barred cross as its logo since 1920, following a proposal at the 1902 Berlin International Conference on Tuberculosis. The two equally long bars are on the upper half of the cross and all six ends are aiguisé. A similar but blue two-barred cross is used as the logo of the American Lung Association.

In botany a balanced cross (equal length bars on equal distances) is used to mark very poisonous plants

In chess
A two-barred cross is used to symbolize checkmate.

Gallery

References

Cross symbols
Crosses in heraldry